Albert Wright Atkinson (March 9, 1861 – June 17, 1952) was an American Major League Baseball pitcher who played three seasons; one in the Union Association and parts of three seasons in the American Association.  He became the first player to desert his existing contract to jump over to the Union Association.  He is one of the few pitchers in Major League history to throw two no-hitters.

Career
Later in the season, Al jumped to the new Union Association, remaining there until season's end. With that move, Al became the first player to desert his existing contract and join the Union Association. He played for two teams during his time in the Union Association, a league that folded following the season. He began play with the Chicago Browns and later played for the Baltimore Monumentals and had a combined record of 20 wins and 26 losses during the 1884 season. On May 24, 1884, he pitched his first no-hitter. He tossed his gem against the Pittsburgh Alleghenys in a 10–1 victory. This no-hitter is also notable for the fact that Al allowed the first batter of the game on base with a hit by pitch and then retired the next 27 batters in a row. The only run scored when Ed Swartwood, the player hit by the pitch, stole second base‚ took third base on a putout‚ and then scored on a passed ball.

He played for an independent minor league team, the Chicago Blues, during the  season, but returned the Athletics for the  season. He pitched his second no-hitter on May 1, 1886, against the New York Metropolitans in a 3–2 victory.

Post-career

After his career, he became a farmer.  Al died at the age of 91 in McDonald County, Missouri, and is interred at the Macedonia Cemetery in Stella, Missouri.

See also

 List of Major League Baseball no-hitters

References

External links

 

1861 births
1952 deaths
Baseball players from Illinois
19th-century baseball players
Major League Baseball pitchers
Philadelphia Athletics (AA) players
Chicago Browns/Pittsburgh Stogies players
Baltimore Monumentals players
Lincoln Tree Planters players
Toronto Canucks players
Rochester Flour Cities players
People from Clinton, Illinois